Kumily also spelt as Kumaly is a revenue village and Gram Panchayat in the Idukki district of Kerala. It is a town in Cardamom Hills near Thekkady and Periyar Tiger Reserve. Kumily is a gateway town into Kerala from Tamil Nadu.

History 
The present-day Kumily has roots in the British colonial period. The area was once owned by the Thekkumkoor rajas in central Travancore and later when Marthanda Varma conducted his campaigns in central Travancore, regions including Kumily came under the kingdom of Travancore. Till the end of the 19th century, the area was given under control of Poonjar kings. But the drastic and significant changes occurred in the region by the advent of British powers. They obtained these regions from the local rulers and transformed the forestlands into cultivatable one. Large-scale production of cash crops like cardamom, pepper, coffee, cinnamon etc. started in the hilly terrains. Many people from in and outside Kerala were brought to work in these plantations.

Demographics 
As of 2011 Census, Kumily village had population of 30,276 where 15,162 are males and 15,114 are females. The average sex ratio was 997 lower than the state average of 1084. In Kumily, 10.3% of the population was under 6 years of age. Kumily had an average literacy of 90.5% lower than the state average of 94%; male literacy was 93.6% and female literacy was .87.4%.

Transportation
Two national highways pass through Kumily town.
 NH 183 (previously known as NH 220) connects Kollam in Kerala and Dindigul in Tamil Nadu. The part of Kottayam to Kumily is commonly known as KK road which is the main steam of transportation and passing through the near by towns Vandiperiyar, Kuttikkanam, Mundakayam, Kanjirapally, Ponkunnam and reaches Kottayam. KK road also connects Kumily to Thiruvananthapuram through Mundakayam and Pathanamthitta. Also Ernakulam can access through Mundakayam, Ponkunnam, Pala, Thalayolaparambu and Thripunithura. 

 NH 185 connects Adimaly and Kumily through important towns like Painavu, Cheruthoni, Kattappana and Anavilasam of Idukki district.

The nearest railway station is at Kottayam of 107 km distance.
Cochin International Airport is the nearest airport to Kumily of about 140 km distance.

See also
 Thekkady
 Wagamon
 Vandiperiyar
 Periyar
 Gavi

References

Cities and towns in Idukki district
Villages in Idukki district

ml:കുമളി